The first Nawaz Sharif ministry under prime minister Nawaz Sharif was sworn into office on 9 November 1990, after the nine-party Islami Jamhoori Ittehad (IJI) unanimously nominated him the government head.



Cabinet
Sharif's 18-member cabinet was one of the smallest in the country's history, especially compared to the record 58-member cabinet of his ousted predecessor Benazir Bhutto. Sharif insisted on bringing nearly a dozen politicians with links to Gen Zia-ul-Haq.

Amongst the 18 members initially selected for the cabinet, nine were from Punjab, two from the Islamabad Capital Territory, six from Sindh and one from Balochistan. The cabinet was later expanded to include representation from the North-West Frontier Province Although being a member of the IJI alliance, the Jamaat-e-Islami (JI) members declined to participate in Nawaz Sharif’s cabinet.

Changes
 9 March 1991 – Chaudhry Amir Hussain is appointed as the state minister for the Ministry of Law for the second time.
 April 1991 – Akram Zaki is made the acting federal minister for the Ministry of Foreign Affairs.
 10 September 1991
 Syed Ghous Ali Shah is appointed as the federal minister for the Ministry of Defence.
 The prime minister retains the authority of the Ministry of Foreign Affairs and appoints Siddiq Khan Kanju as the state minister for the ministry.
 *Chaudhry Abdul Ghafoor is appointed as the federal minister for the Ministry of Law.

Citations

References
 
 

1990 establishments in Pakistan
Nawaz Sharif